Good is that which is to be preferred and prescribed; not evil.

Good or Goods may also refer to:

Common uses
 "Good" the opposite of evil, for the distinction between positive and negative entities, see Good and evil
 Goods, materials that satisfy human wants and provide utility
 Capital good is a durable good that is used in the production of goods or services.
 Final good or consumer good is a commodity that is used by the consumer to satisfy current wants or needs, rather than to produce another good.

Places
 Good, West Virginia, United States, an unincorporated community

People
 Good (surname) 
 List of people known as the Good

Film, television, and theater
 Good (play), a 1981 play by Cecil Philip Taylor
 Good (film), a 2008 adaptation of Taylor's play
 The Goods: Live Hard, Sell Hard, a 2009 American comedy directed by Neal Brennan
 The Goods (TV series), a Canadian talk show and lifestyle program
 "The Good" (Law & Order: Criminal Intent), a 2006 TV episode

Music
 GOOD Music, an American record label
 The Goods (band), a 1989–1999 American rock band

Albums
 Good (Morphine album) or the title song, 1992
 Good, by Goodshirt, 2001

Songs
 "Good" (Better Than Ezra song), 1995
 "Good" (Twin XL song), 2018
 "Good (Can't Be Anything Else)", by Cody Carnes, 2022
 "Good", by Allie X from CollXtion I, 2015
 "Good", by Dizzee Rascal from The Fifth, 2013
 "Good", by Lindsay Ell from The Project, 2017

Brands and enterprises
 Good Technology, a mobile security provider
 Good Worldwide, a media and events company

Politics
Good (political party), South African political party founded by Patricia de Lille, styled as GOOD
Good Party (İYİ Party), Turkish political party

See also 
 Form of the Good, Plato's macrocosmic view of goodness in living
 God (disambiguation)
 Goode, surname
 Goodes (disambiguation)
 Goodness (disambiguation)
 Summum bonum, the "highest good"